Novaya Chara is an urban locality (an urban-type settlement) in Kalarsky District of Zabaykalsky Krai, Russia, located in the basin of the Chara River, in the eastern parts of Stanovoy Range, approximately  in a straight line northeast of the krai's administrative center of Chita, and  from the district's administrative center of Chara. Population:

History
It was founded in connection to the construction of the Baikal-Amur Mainline in the 1980s, near the older village of Chara, named for the river on which it stood. The station and settlement were built by workers from the Kazakh SSR; as part of the BAM project, sections of the route were placed under the patronage of Komsomol brigades from different parts of the Soviet Union.

Regular rail traffic from Tynda in Amur Oblast to Novaya Chara began in 1988; traffic from the west of the settlement on the section from Severobaykalsk started in 1989.  The completion of the BAM did not bring the expected economic development to the area, and with the economic crisis of the late 1980s, around half the population left. Nearby are the Udokan copper deposit, Chineysky vanadium deposit and Unkur silver-copper deposit.

Tourism

Novaya Chara is the starting point for trekking tours in the Kodar Mountains, as well as the Chara Sands, a  area of sand dunes northwest of the settlement, across the river.

Economy
Novaya Chara's only real economic activity centers on its situation as an important station on the BAM. However, there is potential for the settlement to become the center for a mining region currently under development, with a  branch line built between 1998 and 2002 from Novaya Chara to the titanium, vanadium, and iron ore mine Chineyskoye.

The Chineyskoye mine contains both Russia's largest titanium deposit, and the world's largest recorded vanadium deposit. Repair and reconstruction of the line is currently being undertaken.

Also on this branch line are the rare-earth metal mine Katuginskoye, iron ore mine Sulumatskoye, and large anthracite deposits at Chitkanda.

Around  to the south west of Novaya Chara is the Unkur silver and copper deposit, which is currently under exploration.

The settlement is also serviced by a small airport.

References

Urban-type settlements in Zabaykalsky Krai